Bend Me, Shape Me is the second album from the 1960s jazz–rock group The American Breed, released in February 1968. The album peaked at #99 on Billboard'''s pop albums chart,  and the title song, a cover of The Outsiders 1966 song, became the group's only Top 10 hit, reaching #5 on Billboard's pop singles chart in February 1968. The album and the single both went gold, and remains the group's biggest selling album to this day. The only other major hit single from this album was a cover of The Vulcanes 1966 song "Green Light" (#39).

Track listing

Personnel
Gary Loizzo - lead guitar, lead vocals
Al Ciner - rhythm guitar, backing vocals
Charles Colbert - bass, backing vocals
Lee Graziano - drums, backing vocals, trumpet

References

External links
 Bend Me, Shape Me'' at Discogs

1968 albums
The American Breed albums